Field Guide to the End of the World is a book of poetry that was written by Jeannine Hall Gailey, won the 2015 Moon City Poetry Award, and was published in 2016 by Moon City Press. This collection, Gailey's fifth, "delivers a whimsical look at our culture’s obsession with apocalypse as well as a thoughtful reflection on our resources in the face of disasters both large and small, personal and public."

Awards 
Won the 2017 Elgin Award from the Science Fiction & Fantasy Poetry Association.
Finalist for the Horror Writers Association 2016 Bram Stoker Awards. 
Won the 2015 Moon City Poetry Award.

Reviews
Critical reviews of Field Guide to the End of the World have appeared in the following literary publications:
 Entropy
 Escape Into Life
 New Orleans Review
 Pedestal Magazine
 Rain Taxi
 The Rumpus
 The Seattle Review of Books
 Star*Line

External links 
 Official book page

References

2016 poetry books
American poetry collections